William Masters Smith (20 March 1802 – 24 December 1861) was a British Conservative Party politician. He was a Member of Parliament (MP) for West Kent from 1852 to 1857. He married Frances Elphinstone, daughter of Sir Howard Elphinstone, 1st Baronet, on 6 September 1836.

References

1802 births
1861 deaths
People from Kent
Conservative Party (UK) MPs for English constituencies
UK MPs 1852–1857